Judah Even Shemuel (Ukraine, 1886-Jerusalem, 1976) was a Ukrainian born, later Israeli, lexicographer, whose English-Hebrew dictionary was known as The Kaufman Dictionary.

He is not to be confused with another Hebrew lexicographer, Jacob Knaani, who also had the German-Yiddish surname Kaufmann.

References

Israeli lexicographers
Ukrainian emigrants to Israel
1886 births
1976 deaths
Ukrainian Jews
20th-century lexicographers
Jewish lexicographers